In mathematics, the method of descent is the term coined by the French mathematician Jacques Hadamard as a method for solving a partial differential equation in several real or complex variables, by regarding it as the specialisation of an equation in more variables, constant in the extra parameters. This method has been used to solve the wave equation, the heat equation and other versions of the Cauchy initial value problem.

As  wrote:

References

Partial differential equations